Kirriemuir railway station served the burgh of Kirriemuir, Angus, Scotland from 1861 to 1965 on the Scottish Midland Junction Railway.

History 
The station opened on 12 August 1861 by the Scottish North Eastern Railway.  The station was closed to passengers on 4 August 1952 and to goods traffic in 1965.

References 

Disused railway stations in Angus, Scotland
Former Caledonian Railway stations
Railway stations in Great Britain opened in 1861
Railway stations in Great Britain closed in 1952
1861 establishments in Scotland
1965 disestablishments in Scotland
Kirriemuir